Nam Song Chol (Chosŏn'gŭl: 남성철; Hanja:南成哲; born 7 May 1982) is a North Korean international football player.

Nam has appeared for the Korea DPR national football team in 19 FIFA World Cup qualifying matches, including a game against Iran where he was dismissed for pushing the referee.

Goals for senior national team

References

External links 

 

1982 births
Living people
North Korean footballers
North Korea international footballers
April 25 Sports Club players
2010 FIFA World Cup players

Association football wingers
Association football defenders